Hunter's Cemetery is a Commonwealth War Graves Commission burial ground for the dead of World War I situated on the grounds of Beaumont Hamel Newfoundland Memorial Park near the French town of Beaumont-Hamel.

History and layout
During the Battle of the Somme, German forces near Beaumont-Hamel were attacked in vain on 1 July 1916. The area was finally captured by the 51st (Highland) and 63rd (Royal Naval) Divisions on the following 13 November. Hunter's Cemetery, possibly named after Reverend Hunter, a Chaplain attached to the Black Watch Regiment, is in fact a great shell-hole. Soldiers of the 51st Division, who fell in the capture of Beaumont-Hamel were buried in the shell-hole after the battle. There are now over 40 war casualties commemorated in this site. Hunter's Cemetery stands at the upper end of "Y" Ravine, within Newfoundland Memorial Park.

External links
 
 

Commonwealth War Graves Commission cemeteries in France
1917 establishments in France
World War I cemeteries in France
Battle of the Somme
Cemeteries in Somme (department)